The N. J. Felix House is a historic home located in Asharoken, Suffolk County, New York. It was built about 1900 and is a -story, four-bay, shingled and clapboard residence with a steeply pitched hipped roof in an eclectic combination of the Queen Anne and Colonial Revival styles. It features two elongated decorative brick chimneys and gable dormers. It is a representative example of a large, upper-income single-family dwelling along Huntington's north shore.  Also located on the property is a contributing privy.

It was added to the National Register of Historic Places in 1985.

References

Houses on the National Register of Historic Places in New York (state)
Queen Anne architecture in New York (state)
Colonial Revival architecture in New York (state)
Houses completed in 1900
Houses in Suffolk County, New York
National Register of Historic Places in Suffolk County, New York